Serghei Victorovici Savcenco (10 August 1966 – 3 July 2010) was a Soviet and Moldovan footballer.

References

External links 
 

1966 births
2010 deaths
People from Vinnytsia Oblast
Soviet footballers
Moldovan footballers
Soviet Top League players
FC Zimbru Chișinău players
PFC CSKA Moscow players
CS Tiligul-Tiras Tiraspol players
CSF Bălți players
SC Tavriya Simferopol players
Ukrainian Premier League players
FC Torpedo Zaporizhzhia players
Moldovan expatriate footballers
Expatriate footballers in Ukraine
Expatriate footballers in Romania
Expatriate footballers in Russia
Expatriate footballers in Israel
Expatriate footballers in Turkmenistan
Moldovan Super Liga players
FC Saturn Ramenskoye players
FC Nistru Otaci players
FC Tiraspol players
Association football forwards